The UK Albums Chart is a music chart compiled by the Official Charts Company that calculates the best-selling artist albums of the week in the United Kingdom. Since 2005, the chart has been based on the sales of both physical and digital albums, on the condition that the album was available in both formats. In 2007, the rules were changed so that legal downloads of all albums, irrespective of whether a physical copy was available, were eligible to chart.

Between 2000 and 2009, more than 100 albums sold more than 1 million copies in the United Kingdom. At the end of the decade, a retrospective chart was compiled by the Official Charts Company to determine the best-selling artist album of this ten-year period. The title was won by James Blunt, with his debut album Back to Bedlam, released in 2004. The album sold 3.19 million copies, finishing ahead of Dido's album No Angel, which sold 3.05 million copies. Dido featured twice in the top 10 best-sellers, with Life for Rent being the seventh best-seller of the decade. Amy Winehouse (3), Leona Lewis (4) and David Gray (5) were the other solo-artists to feature. The Beatles' compilation album 1 was the highest entry by a group in the chart at number 6; Coldplay (8), Keane (9) and Scissor Sisters (10) made up the rest of the top ten. Robbie Williams had the most albums on the list with five entries.

BBC Radio 1 announced the chart in a programme, presented by DJ Nihal, on 28 December 2009. The list of the best-selling albums of the decade in the United Kingdom was also announced in a series of three shows between 29 and 31 December 2009. As it was broadcast during the last week of December, the chart did not include sales from the final week of the year. An updated chart, including sales up to 31 December 2009 and containing some minor changes from the chart broadcast on Radio 1, was published in the UK trade magazine Music Week in the issue dated 30 January 2010.

The list of the best-selling compilation albums of the decade in the UK Compilation Chart was dominated by the Now That's What I Call Music! series of albums. The best-selling compilation album of the 2000s was Now 47 with 1,371,324 copies sold, ahead of Now 50 with 1,367,380 copies. The best-selling soundtrack album of the decade was Mamma Mia! The Movie Soundtrack, with a total of 1,320,357 to the end of 2009.

Best-selling albums

Note:

See also
 List of best-selling singles of the 2000s (decade) in the United Kingdom
 List of best-selling albums of the 21st century in the United Kingdom

References

2000s
United Kingdom
2000s (UK)
British record charts